The Canadian Baseball League was an independent minor league that operated in 2003. The league's only Commissioner was Major League Baseball Hall of Famer and Canadian Baseball Hall of Fame member Ferguson Jenkins. The league featured former major league players such as Francisco Cabrera, Floyd Youmans, Rich Butler, Steve Sinclair.

The CBL was based in Vancouver, British Columbia.

The championship trophy was the Jenkins Cup, named after the commissioner of the league, Ferguson Jenkins.

History
The CBL was the brainchild of Tony Riviera, a former major league scout, and the face of the league.  It was backed by former Microsoft product developer Charlton Lui, and later by former Yahoo! president, and part owner of the San Francisco Giants, Jeff Mallett.  Canadian Baseball Hall of Famer Ferguson Jenkins was brought in to act as the league's Commissioner.

Riviera's vision had big goals, and he followed suit by making big promises.  Riviera stated that the CBL would be "AAA quality", He was rumoured to have approached the Winnipeg Goldeyes about switching leagues, and even nominated Pete Rose for the Canadian Baseball Hall of Fame.

The big plans initially appeared to be possible. The league announced a national television deal with sports channel The Score, while a crowd of 5,100 took in the league's inaugural game in London, Ontario.

Quick demise
However, despite early promises that the league could, and would, average over 2,000 fans per game, it was clear that the CBL was not remotely close to projections. Only two markets averaged over 1,000 fans per game:  Victoria at 1,700 and Calgary at 1,000. Four teams averaged fewer than 300 per game: Kelowna (271), Saskatoon (256), Welland (181) and Trois-Rivières (163). The national TV deal was cancelled after only six weeks after the CBL was unable to find enough sponsors to cover the production costs.

The Montreal franchise never played a game in that city due to a lack of a playing field, as they were denied a lease at Olympic Stadium. Their home games were played at Stade Amedee Roy in Sherbrooke instead.

The Abbotsford Saints relocated to Trois Rivieres, Quebec before the season started.

The CBL's swan song was the All-Star game, held at Calgary. Unwilling to absorb any more losses, Mallett pulled the plug on the league, suspending operations the day before the game. A crowd of over 5,700 (the largest crowd to come to Burns Park all season) watched the East and West All-Stars play to a 5-5, ten-inning tie. Following the game, a home run derby was held, in which Jamie Gann of Kelowna hit the only dinger, thus giving the West the victory. Despite losing as much as $4 million on the CBL, Mallett initially promised to bring the league back in 2004. However, the remaining assets of the league were quietly auctioned off on December 1, 2003 in Vancouver and the league never returned.

Teams

The eight teams that played in the CBL, and their record at the time the league was suspended.  The Calgary Outlaws were declared the Jenkins Cup champions on the basis of having the league's best record.

West Division
Calgary Outlaws (24–13) – Foothills Stadium
Saskatoon Legends (22–15) – Cairns Field
Kelowna Heat (18–19) – Elks Stadium
Victoria Capitals (13–22) – Royal Athletic Park

East Division
London Monarchs (20–13) – Labatt Park
Niagara Stars (15–15) – Welland Stadium
Trois-Rivières Saints (14–17) – Stade Municipal
Montreal Royales (10–22) – Amedée Roy Stadium (Sherbrooke)

References

Independent baseball leagues
2003 in baseball
2003 disestablishments in Canada
2003 establishments in Canada
Sports leagues established in 2003
Sports leagues disestablished in 2003
2003 in Canadian sports
Defunct baseball leagues in Canada